William M. Brawley (born August 30, 1949) is a former Republican member of the North Carolina House of Representatives. He represented the 103rd district.

North Carolina House of Representatives
Brawley voted for the 2017 budget that kept teacher pay at $35,000. Brawley also voted for the 2016 budget that provided tax cuts to corporations over education funding.

Brawley supported a controversial plan that would add toll lanes to I-77 in Charlotte. In 2015, Brawley voted for a bill that will add toll lanes to I-485 and US 74 by 2019.

In 2015, Brawley voted for a bill that would block the Medicaid expansion. The Medicaid expansion would provide healthcare for 500,000 low-income North Carolinians.

Brawley sponsored a bill that would make it more difficult for towns to inspect residential properties for unsafe conditions.

In 2017, Brawley sponsored a bill that would establish a committee to analyze the impact of breaking up large school districts. The committee found that breaking up the district would cause resegregation, disrupt bus routes, and cause legal issues. In 2018, Brawley voted for a bill that would create allow four majority-white suburban towns in Charlotte to create their own charter schools. This bill was criticized by the North Carolina NAACP President, Anthony Spearman, saying this was an attempt to create "Jim Crow independent school districts".

Brawley voted for a bill that would allow landfill operators to spray landfill fluids, called leachate, into the air. In 2014, Brawley voted for a bill that would allow Duke Energy to clean up their coal ash spill. In 2017, Brawley voted to cut funding from the NC Department of Environmental Quality, days after the GenX story broke.

Brawley was defeated for re-election in 2018 by Democrat Rachel Hunt. He lost a rematch against Hunt in 2020. Brawley is the Republican nominee for the seat again in the 2022 election.

Electoral history

2020

2018

2016

2014

2012

2010

References

Living people
1949 births
People from Matthews, North Carolina
21st-century American politicians
Democratic Party members of the North Carolina House of Representatives